The 2017 European Road Cycling Championships was the 23rd running of the European Road Cycling Championships, and took place from 2 August until 6 August 2017 in Herning, Denmark. The event consisted of a total of 6 road races and 6 time trials, regulated by the Union Européenne de Cyclisme (UEC).

Schedule

Individual time trial

Road race

Events summary

Medal table

References

External links
 Euro Road 2017 
 UEC website

European Road Championships by year
European Road Championships, 2016
European Road
Road
International cycle races hosted by Denmark
Sport in Herning
August 2017 sports events in Europe